Her Majesty's Canadian Ship (HMCS) Protecteur (AOR 509) was the lead ship of the s in service with the Royal Canadian Navy. She was part of Maritime Forces Pacific (MARPAC), homeported at CFB Esquimalt, British Columbia. Built by Saint John Shipbuilding and Dry Docks in Saint John, New Brunswick, she was commissioned on 30 August 1969. She was the first Canadian naval unit to carry the name Protecteur; however, there have been several units, including a base, named .

Mostly known for her humanitarian efforts, Protecteur had also served in times of war including Operation Friction and Operation Apollo in the Persian Gulf region, multi-national naval exercises, and as part of the INTERFET in East Timor. Operation Apollo was the largest deployment of the Royal Canadian Navy since the Korean War. Protecteur, as well as her sister ship Preserver, were scheduled to be paid off in 2017, however, damage due to an engine fire aboard the ship in 2014 forced Protecteur to be paid off prematurely. Protecteur was decommissioned at a farewell ceremony on 14 May 2015.

Building Protecteur
Protecteur was the first Canadian naval unit to carry the name Protecteur, French for "Protector"; however, there have been two Australian and seven British naval units named Protector. The name was also used for a Canadian base, named .

Construction
First authorized in 1959, HMCS Protecteur was constructed by Saint John Shipbuilding and Dry Docks in Saint John, New Brunswick, starting on 17 October 1967, was launched on 18 July 1968, and was officially commissioned by the Canadian Forces on 30 August 1969.

General characteristics
Protecteur was one of two ships in the Protecteur-class of replenishment oilers in service with the Royal Canadian Navy.

Armament
Four BAE Systems Mark 36 SRBOC chaff launchers and an AN/SLQ-25 Nixie towed decoy were the ship's primary defences. When Protecteur was originally launched, she was fitted with a twin 3″/50 caliber gun mounted on her bow; however, the 3″ guns were replaced with two 20 mm Phalanx CIWS mounts, one at the bow and one astern in August 1990. The CIWS emplacements were part of the upgrades that Protecteur received before deploying to the Persian Gulf region. The CIWS was found above the bridge.

Her former 3″/50 guns were temporarily fitted, together with two Bofors 40 mm guns, six  machine guns, as well as Blowpipe and Javelin MANPADs during the Gulf War. The CIWS mounts were retained after the war, but the Bofors and 76 mm gun were removed from Protecteur after returning from war.

Originally Protecteur was to be fitted with Mark 29 NATO Sea Sparrow. However, due to delays in procurement, the Sea Sparrow system was never installed. The Sikorsky CH-124 Sea King helicopters on board Protecteur also provided weapons support, carrying Mark 46 torpedoes and a 7.62 mm machine gun.

Crew
Three hundred sixty-five men and women served on Protecteur. There were 27 officers aboard ship and a total of 45 crew members who were part of the air detachment that flew three CH-124 Sea King helicopters off the back of the ship. In 1988 the crew of the Protecteur was officially desegregated, allowing both men and women to serve on board her. Protecteur was equipped with a small dental clinic, which provided dental care for the Canadian Forces when deployed.

Service

In 1974 the Polish sailboat Gedania embarked on an attempt to traverse the Northwest Passage, as part of a journey to circumnavigate the North and South American continents. Although the Canadian authorities refused to grant the necessary visa, the captain of the yacht persisted, and Protecteur was sent to intercept the yacht on 30 August 1975. The captain eventually turned back of his own accord, but the operation was estimated to have cost $400,000 (equivalent to $ in ).

In 1980, while Protecteur was operating off the coast of Portugal, Commanding Officer Captain Larry Dzioba hoisted an Esso flag on the ship's mast, joking that they were the "biggest floating gas station in the neighbourhood". In 1981, Protecteur served in CARIBOPS 81 off the coast of Puerto Rico, along with at least two Canadian destroyers. Protecteur and her CH-124 helicopters performed a nighttime rescue of the crew of a disabled Norwegian chemical tanker in June 1982. The Norwegian crew was forced to abandon their ship after a fire had broken out. For the 75th anniversary of the Royal Canadian Navy, Protecteur hosted a dinner with the captains of 35 ships, including ships from Belgium, Brazil, Denmark, France, Great Britain, Italy, the Netherlands, Norway, Portugal, and the United States, as well as then Governor General Jeanne Sauvé and Prince Andrew.

In 1991, Protecteur was part of the Canadian contingent sent to the Persian Gulf as part of Operation Desert Shield and later Operation Friction (the Canadian name for its operations during the Gulf War). The ship was honoured with the Gulf and Kuwait Medal and the Arabian Sea award for her service in the war. In 1992, Protecteur was sent to help after Hurricane Andrew in Florida, with tasks including repairing schools, community centres, and hospitals in the region. A small pool was built on the helipad of Protecteur providing some relief to hurricane ravaged Floridians. Homes, churches, and a senior centre were also repaired in the Bahamas. The homeport of Protecteur was changed from CFB Halifax to CFB Esquimalt after the hurricane relief efforts. The frigate  and Protecteur participated in the multi-national RIMPAC 98 off the coast of Hawaii in June 1998.Protecteur was deployed to East Timor as part of the Australian-led INTERFET peacekeeping taskforce from 23 October 1999 to 23 January 2000. Crew from  Protecteur helped reconstruct a police academy in Dili during their deployment in support of INTERFET. The Royal Canadian Mounted Police then used the newly reconstructed academy to set up a training school for the National Police of East Timor. Operation Apollo was the largest Canadian deployment since the Korean War.

On 19 September 2011, Protecteur departed from CFB Esquimalt for a two-month deployment off southern California as part of the  carrier strike group. Protecteur joined the destroyer Algonquin and the frigate  in Fleet Week activities in San Diego, California, between 26 and 30 September 2011. On 30 August 2013, the ship was involved in a collision with Algonquin during towing exercises. There were no injuries to personnel, although Protecteur sustained damage to her bow. The damage was repaired in time for Protecteur to participate in a Task Group Exercise with the United States Navy in mid-October 2013.

Chosin attempted to tow Protecteur, but the towing line broke. About 20 members of the ship's crew were injured as a result of the fire, and her engines were badly damaged. After a preliminary assessment, it was decided that the vessel could not be repaired in Pearl Harbor. On 16 May Protecteur left Pearl Harbor under tow from the United States Military Sealift Command-operated  rescue and salvage ship  for an expected three week journey to her home port of CFB Esquimalt. Protecteur was delivered to Esquimalt on 31 May 2014.

Retirement and interim replacementProtecteur was decommissioned at a farewell ceremony on 14 May 2015. Plans for replacing Protecteur and her sister ship, Preserver, were first brought up in 2004. Lack of spare parts for the ship's boiler and the fact that she is a single-skinned tanker were the main driving points to replacing Protecteur and Preserver.

It had been planned that the ship would have continued to operate until 2015; however, the Joint Support Ship Project would not have been completed until two years later, leaving a gap in the ability of the RCN to refuel and resupply her own ships while deployed. Following extensive damage as a result of a fire in February 2014, Protecteurs decommissioning was brought forward as repairs would have been  "...too expensive for the navy to consider"  given that she was due to be retired in 2017.

Protecteur, along with Algonquin, was sold for scrapping on 27 November 2015 to R.J. MacIsaac Ltd. of Antigonish, Nova Scotia. They were towed to Nova Scotia where the work was done  at Liverpool.

In October 2015, a container ship, was acquired by Davie Shipyards to be converted into an auxiliary vessel, to be leased to the RCN as a temporary bridge between the Protecteur class until the new AOR class becomes available. That ship was converted and was delivered to the Royal Canadian Navy as MV Asterix on 6 December 2017. On 10 March 2017, ex-Protecteur caught fire while being dismantled in Liverpool, Nova Scotia. Residual fuel caught fire during demolition of the vessel.

 New class and future service 
On 12 September 2017 Vice Admiral Ron Lloyd, commander of the Royal Canadian Navy, announced that the new Joint Support Ships would no longer be named for battles of the War of 1812.  Originally to be named Queenston and Chateauguay, the Joint Support Ships will instead be named Protecteur and Preserver, perpetuating the names of the former Protecteur class.

See also

  the predecessor to Protecteur''

References

External links
 
 Protecteur-class homepage

 

1968 ships
Protecteur-class replenishment oilers
Ships built in New Brunswick
Auxiliary ships of the Royal Canadian Navy
Maritime incidents in 2014